"Chasing Cars" is a song by Northern Irish-Scottish alternative rock band Snow Patrol. It was released as the second single from their fourth studio album, Eyes Open (2006). It was released on 6 June 2006, in the United States and 24 July 2006, in the United Kingdom. The song gained significant popularity in the US after being featured in the second season finale of the medical drama Grey's Anatomy, which aired on 15 May 2006.

"Chasing Cars" was one of the songs that revealed the impact of legal downloads on single sales in the UK, selling consistently for years after its release. The song is Snow Patrol's biggest-selling single to date, ending 2006 as that year's 14th best-selling single in the UK. It was the last song performed live on the BBC's Top of the Pops that year. Released in the post-Britpop period, the song peaked at number 6 on the UK Singles Chart, and number 5 on the US Billboard Hot 100.

At the 49th Annual Grammy Awards in 2007, "Chasing Cars" was nominated for Best Rock Song, and at the 2007 Brit Awards it was nominated for Best British Single. As of 2019, the song has spent 111 weeks in the official UK top 75, 166 in the top 100 and had sold over one million copies in the UK by October 2013. It has also sold 3,900,000 copies in the US by January 2015, making it one of the top best-selling rock songs in the digital era. In 2009, UK music licensing body PPL announced that "Chasing Cars" was the most widely played song of the decade in the UK. Ten years later, it was revealed as the most-played song of the 21st century on UK radio.

Background
Lead singer Gary Lightbody reportedly wrote the song when he became sober after a binge of white wine, in the garden of song producer Jacknife Lee's Kent cottage. The song has Lightbody singing a plain melody over sparse guitars, which has an ever-building crescendo. In an interview with Rolling Stone, he said "It's the purest love song that I've ever written. There's no knife-in-the-back twist. When I read these lyrics back, I was like, 'Oh, that's weird.' All the other love songs I've written have a dark edge." The phrase "Chasing Cars" came from Lightbody's father, in reference to a girl Lightbody was infatuated with, "You're like a dog chasing a car. You'll never catch it and you just wouldn't know what to do with it if you did."

Promotion and release
Snow Patrol played "Chasing Cars" on an appearance on Late Night with Conan O'Brien. The song was also performed as the last live performance on long-running music programme Top of the Pops. The band also performed the song when they were the musical guest on 17 March 2007 episode of Saturday Night Live, hosted by Julia Louis-Dreyfus. Additionally, the band played the song live in their appearance at Live Earth; on 7 July 2007, this song was performed during the London leg of the Live Earth concert at Wembley Stadium and at Oxegen later on that night in Ireland.

"Chasing Cars" was heard on the TV show One Tree Hill's third-season finale episode, "The Show Must Go On", which aired in the US on 3 May 2006. Several weeks later, the song appeared on the second-season finale of Grey's Anatomy on 15 May 2006, and the song found a larger listening audience and pushed its way onto the download and pop charts in the United States. The song was made into a music video for the show, serving as a promotion for its third season. The music video shows scenes from the first and second seasons as well as previously unseen scenes from the third season, with clips in-between from the UK music video of the song. It was heard again in the eighteenth episode of the show's seventh season on 31 March 2011, along with the cast's cover of Brandi Carlile's "The Story" and The Fray's "How to Save a Life". In the UK, it was also used in the 'Best Bits' montage on the live final of the seventh series of Big Brother on 18 August 2006.

Music video

Two music videos were made: one for the UK and one for the US.

In the UK music video, directed by Arni & Kinski, Gary Lightbody lies on the open ground as cameras film him from different angles. It starts raining, splashing his face and hands. Lightbody enters a pool of water next to him and, at the end of the video, he gets out of the water, rises to his feet and looks up at the camera as it zooms out overhead.

In the US version, directed by Nick Brandt, Lightbody is shown lying down in busy places while singing. People ignore and step over him. Among the places he lies are a diner (he sits at a table at the beginning), an intersection in Downtown L.A., the top of an escalator, a subway car, the top of a hill overlooking the Golden State Freeway and, at the end, a bed in a hotel room.

Reception

Critical reception

The song received critical acclaim. Billboard magazine's Sven Phillip found "Chasing Cars" to be the only song on Eyes Open which was "not to be missed". He called it a "catchy, colossal ballad that succeeds without any fireworks". About.com called it a "true gem of a love song". Yahoo! Music's Adam Webb, however, had mixed feelings for the single, when he awarded it 5 stars out of 10, saying it was a "misguided attempt to recreate its breast-beating slo-motion scarf-waving formula." Further, he made comparisons of the song to Hollywood soundtracks, which in his words are "about as subtle as a rhino and too overt to be truly affecting."

The song was nominated for a 2007 Grammy Award for Best Rock Song as well as for a 2007 BRIT Award for Best British Single. In 2007, "Chasing Cars" was voted number 1 in the Top 500 Songs: The Words Behind the Music, on Bristol's GWR FM (and other stations in The One Network).

Commercial performance
"Chasing Cars" was released as an overlapping single in early June, and the video was re-edited to include clips from Grey's Anatomy. The video failed to catch on, regardless, so a third version was filmed for the edited single version of the song. On 13 September 2006, the song soared in the digital music charts to become the most-downloaded song in the U.S. iTunes Store, just one day after the DVD release of the second season of Grey's Anatomy. The song was used in Verbotene Liebe, a German soap opera.

The song was released as a download-only single on 17 July 2006, and entered the UK Singles Chart in the week ending 29 July at number 25 on the strength of download sales alone. Its physical release on 24 July pushed the song up to number 15, peaking six weeks later at number 6. However, seven weeks after that, in November the CD single was deleted and, under the chart rules prevailing at that time, the song was removed from the chart two weeks after that, having clocked up 17 weeks in total. It was then absent from the chart for seven weeks, but in January 2007, a change to the chart rules meant that all downloads, with or without a physical equivalent, were now eligible to chart. "Chasing Cars" duly surged back in at a top 10 position (number 9, just three places below its peak), and remained on the chart for 48 consecutive weeks, entirely on downloads, only falling out again in December. After a three-week absence, in January 2008 it was back again, for 13 weeks this time, peaking at No. 50. It then bowed out for a third time, re-entered the top 75 in June, August, October and November 2008, November 2009, January and December 2010, and March, July and December 2011, and re-entered again on 24 August 2013, charting at No. 66 before climbing up to No. 60 the following week, and up to No. 47 the week after, now taking the song's tally up to 111 weeks on the UK Top 75, which at the time, made it the 2nd longest runner of all time (now currently the 3rd longest runner behind "Perfect" by Ed Sheeran), bettered only by Frank Sinatra's "My Way" (124 weeks). Only for 14 weeks out of those 111 was a physical copy of "Chasing Cars" officially available. It has also spent 166 weeks on the Top 100. It sold its millionth copy in the UK in October 2013.

A physical release of the song did not occur at all in Australia, where the song spent 10 weeks over summer 2006/2007 at number one on the Digital Track Chart. Under ARIA chart rules at the time, songs that had a digital-only release were ineligible to chart. When the rules finally changed in October 2007 to include digital-only singles (partly due to declining physical sales), "Chasing Cars" had dwindled in popularity and only managed to peak at number 53. Its sales prior to the week it began charting on the official singles chart were not counted; regardless, it spent a further 63 weeks in the lower half of the chart and was later certified triple platinum (for over 210,000 downloads).

"Chasing Cars" was voted number one in a 2006 Virgin Radio Top 500 Songs of All Time poll. After the popularity of its association with the Grey's Anatomy television show and The Vampire Diaries , the song peaked at No. 5 on the Billboard Hot 100 in the US, the band's first Top 10 hit in the US. The song peaked at No. 8 on the Modern Rock Tracks chart. It was the fourth best selling digital single of 2006 in the UK, totalling 190,000 legal downloads, and is the UK's 26th most downloaded song of all time. "Chasing Cars" also went to number one on the Adult Contemporary chart for two non-consecutive weeks. As of February 2015, the song has sold 3,900,000 copies in the US.

Accolades

Covers
 It was covered by The Baseballs for their re-released album Strike! Back!.
 A trance version of the song was remixed by Blake Jarrell & Topher Jones. It aired on the trance radio show A State of Trance episode 262 on 17 August 2006. It was later voted to be the 12th best track played on A State of Trance in 2006 by the listeners.
 Tim McGraw and Faith Hill covered the song during the 2007 leg of their Soul2Soul II Tour.
 In 2008, Kate Ceberano recorded a version for her album So Much Beauty.
 In 2009, Boyce Avenue covered it for their album Acoustic Sessions, Vol. 4.
 In 2009, Snow Patrol produced a reworked version of the song at the Royal Albert Hall.
 In September 2014, Ed Sheeran delivered a rendition of the song on MTV.
 In 2014, Curved Air covered it for their album North Star.
 In 2019, Nasser recorded a version for the Filipino theme song of the Korean drama Are You Human? on GMA Network.

In popular culture

 The song was featured in the 2016 documentary Holy Hell about the 1980s West Hollywood cult Buddhafield and its allegedly manipulative and abusive leader. The song plays on toward the end of the documentary as ex-members of the cult are seen dancing in a field and while crying.
 The song is referenced by Ed Sheeran in his song "All of the Stars".
The song is referenced by Dean Lewis in his song "7 Minutes".
 The song is recurringly featured on Grey's Anatomy; as a result, the song is commonly associated with the show.
 The song was also featured on The CW's drama One Tree Hill in the third season finale "The Show Must Go On".
 The song was used by Party Ben alongside The Police's "Every Breath You Take" to create the mashup song "Every Car You Chase", which got Snow Patrol's attention and appeared on the 2011 romantic comedy film Just Go with It.
 The song was used in a 2007 episode of Gavin & Stacey in which the two main characters marry.
 The song was used in a behind-the-scenes special episode of EastEnders in 2010 when discussing character Stacey Slater's bipolar storyline.
 The song is used as the ending theme of the Japanese Fuji TV and Netflix reality TV show Terrace House, although it was only used in the Japanese broadcast. It is also included on several of the soundtrack albums released compiling music from the first series Terrace House: Boys × Girls Next Door and the film Terrace House: Closing Door.
 The song is also used as the background music for the IdeaPad 320 commercial, with Laura Dern and Anne Hathaway.
The song's chorus is referenced widely throughout the first campaign of the Dungeons and Dragons podcast Not Another D&D Podcast. It spawns several parodies, including “If I Just Filet Here”.
The song is included on the 2012 Philippine romantic film, The Mistress.

Formats and track listings

UK promo (released in July 2006)
 "Chasing Cars" (radio edit) – 4:08
 "Chasing Cars" (album version) – 4:27

UK CD (released 24 July 2006)
 "Chasing Cars" (album version) – 4:27
 "It Doesn't Matter Where, Just Drive" – 3:37

UK 7" (released 24 July 2006)
 "Chasing Cars" (album version) – 4:27
 "Play Me Like Your Own Hand" – 4:15

European CD (released in October 2006)
 "Chasing Cars" (album version) – 4:27
 "Play Me Like Your Own Hand" – 4:15
 "It Doesn't Matter Where, Just Drive" – 3:37

U.S. promo (released in July 2006)
 "Chasing Cars" (Top 40 edit) – 3:58

U.S. iTunes single (released 6 June 2006)
 "Chasing Cars" (live in Toronto) – 4:28

Special Dutch edition
 "Chasing Cars" – 4:27
 "You're All I Have" (live from BNN) – 4:29
 "How to Be Dead" (live from BNN) – 3:24
 "Chasing Cars" (live from BNN) – 4:20

Mexican and Australian promo
 "Chasing Cars" (radio edit) – 4:08
 "Chasing Cars" (album version) – 4:27

UK and Irish 12" bootleg (released 22 January 2007)
 "Chasing Cars" (Blake Jarrell & Topher Jones Remix) – 7:35
 "Open Your Eyes" (Allende Remix) – 7:29

Personnel

Snow Patrol 
Gary Lightbody – vocals, guitar
Gary Lightbody, Nathan Connolly, Tom Simpson, Paul Wilson, Jonny Quinn – songwriter
Nathan Connolly – lead guitar, backing vocals
Tom Simpson – keyboards
Paul Wilson – bass guitar
Jonny Quinn – drums

Additional personnel 
Jacknife Lee – production

Credits adapted from Chasing Cars liner notes.

Charts

Weekly charts

Year-end charts

Decade-end charts

All-time charts

Certifications

See also
 List of million-selling singles in the United Kingdom
 List of songs which have spent the most weeks on the UK Singles Chart

References

External links
 
 
 
 Acoustic performance of "Chasing Cars" for Sky Arts Songbook series.
 IMDB https://www.imdb.com/title/tt1564367/soundtrack

2000s ballads
2006 singles
2006 songs
Interscope Records singles
Rock ballads
Snow Patrol songs
Song recordings produced by Jacknife Lee
Songs about cars
Songs written by Gary Lightbody
Songs written by Jonny Quinn
Songs written by Nathan Connolly
Songs written by Paul Wilson (musician)
Songs written by Tom Simpson (musician)
Music videos directed by Nick Brandt